is a Japanese actor and singer, best known for portraying Kenya Oshitari in the Tenimyu musicals. He is represented by Bamboo.

Filmography

Television
 Music Station (TV Asahi) as Dancer
 London Hearts Friday (2013, TV Asahi) as Seike
 Kamisama no Bōto (2013, NHK-BS)
 Friday Prestige: Gekai Hatomura Shugoro Yami no Chart (2014, Fuji Television)
 Watashitachi ga Puropōzu sa Renai ni wa, 101 no riyū ga atteda na (2015, LaLa TV) as Suzuki
 Butaimon hansamu rakugo awā #9 (2016, Tokyo MX)
 Shūkatsu Kazoku ~Kitto, umaku iku~ (2017, TV Asahi) as Host

Movies 
 Vanilla Boy: Tomorrow Is Another Day (2016) as Kikuhara

Theater 
 Asuhe no Tobira as Dancer
 Tsuki no Kyōshitsu as Tetsuya
 Harō guddobai 
 Godzilla as Godzilla
 Sutēji doa as Sam Hesting
 in the blue (2011) as Matsuoka
 Orenji Inochi no Kiseki (2012, Hakuhinkan Theater) as Various
 Pool Side Story (2012, Akashi Studio) as Ippei Nakajima
 Stand by Me (2012, Studio twl) as Man
 Nemurenu machi no Oji-sama (2012, Space Zero) as Jin
 〜Rōdoku ☆ Danshi〜 Haru no Rōdoku Shūkan Jōnetsu no Arika (2013, Sasazuka Factory) as Liúdōu Niibori
 Nemurenu machi no Oji-sama 〜dreams like bubbles of champagne〜 (2013, Theatre sunmall) as Jin Ōsaka 
 Tenimyu (2013) as Kenya Oshitari
Seigaku vs. Shitenhoji (2013, Nippon Seinenkan)
Undoukai 2014 (2014, Yokohama Arena)
Seigaku vs. Rikkai ~ Nationals (2014, Tokyo Dome City Hall)
Budōkan 2014 (2014, Nippon Budokan)
Dream Live 2014 (2014, Saitama Super Arena)
 How to kill a cat in New York (2014, Theater Green) as Yū Matsuki 
 Hāto no Kuni no Arisu ~Wandafuru Wandā Wārudo~ (2015, Space Zero) as Ace
 Fushigi Yūgi (2015, Shinagawa Prince Hotel) as Yado Tsubasa
 Moon & Day 〜Uchi no Tamashi Rimasen ka?〜 (2015, Space Zero) as Masayuki Sakai
 Nemurenu Yoru no Honkītonkuburūsu Dainishō 〜hiyaku〜 (2015, Kinokuniya Hall) as Rintarō
 A. & C. -Adult Children- (2015, The Pocket) as Danchi
 Katakoi. (2015, The Pocket) as Guest
 La Corda d'Oro: Blue♪Sky First Stage (2015, Space Zero) as Chiaki Tōgane
 Gei-sai (2015, The Pocket)
 Seishun -Aoharu- Tetsudō (2015, Space Zero) as Guest
 Prince Kaguya (2015, Hakuhinkan Theater) as San
 Mayonaka no Yaji-san Kita-san (2016, Tokyo Dome City) as Guest
 Hāto no Kuni no Arisu 〜The Best Revival〜 (2016, Space Zero) as Ace 
 Hansamu rakugo dai nana-maku (2016, Red Theater)
 Akatsuki no Yona (2016, Ex Theater Roppongi) as Soo-Won 
 Kujira no Kora wa Sajō ni Utau (2016, AiiA 2.5 Theater Tokyo) as Ryodari
 Devils and Realist (2016, Space Zero) as Gilles de Rais
 Tarō Urashima (2016, Meiji-za) as Hiramen
 Jōzu ~Takarakuji Atattande Yarimasu~ (2016, Haiyuza Theater) as Guest
 La Corda d'Oro: Blue ♪ Sky Prelude of Ikishikan (2016, Theatre senjyu) as Chiaki Tōgane
 Hansamu rakugo dai hachi-maku (2016, CBGK Shibugeki!!) 
 La Corda d'Oro: Blue♪Sky Second Stage (2016, Space Zero) as Chiaki Tōgane
 Hochikisu myūjiamu (2017, Nakano Theater) as Guest
 Prefecture Puzzle 2017 (2017, Theater Guide) as Tōru Kamoshita
 Tabi Neko Report (2017, Hakuhinkan Theater) as Nana / Satoru
 Sengoku Wars (2017, Tokyo Metropolitan Art Space) as Oda Nobukatsu, Shibata Katsuie
 Snow Princess (2017, Space Zero) as Chris
 Hakuohki SSL: Sweet School Life ~The Stage Route~  (2017, Theater Sunmall) as Nagakura Shinpachi
 Sorekara (2017, Haiyuza Theater) as Guest
 Acharaka (2017, Kichijoji Theater) as Jakū
 Yume ōkoku to nemureru 100-ri no Oji-sama ~Prince Theater~ (2017, AiiA 2.5Theater Tokyo) as Hatter
 Rengoku ni Warau (2017, Sunshine Theatre) as Momochi Shishimon
 Devils and Realist: The Sencod Spirit (2017, Shijuku Face) as Gilles de Rais
 The Years of the Winter Camp in the Meiji Period Festival (2017, Umeda Arts Theater) as one of the Sanada Ten Braves

References

External links
 Agent profile 

1991 births
People from Kyoto Prefecture
Living people
21st-century Japanese male actors